Edwin Baruch Winans (October 31, 1869 – December 31, 1947) was a United States Army officer who attained the rank of major general.

Early life
Winans was born in Hamburg, Michigan as the son of Edwin B. Winans, Governor of Michigan. He attended the United States Military Academy and graduated in 1891, after which he was commissioned a second lieutenant in the 5th Cavalry on June 12, 1891. Among his classmates there were several men who would, like Winans himself, become general officers in the future, such as Andrew Hero Jr., James F. McIndoe, John W. Heavey, John J. Bradley, LeRoy S. Lyon, John L. Hines, and Hanson E. Ely.

Military service

Winans served in the Indian Territory and Texas from 1891 to 1897; was a professor of military science and tactics, Michigan Military Academy, from 1897 to 1898; and served with a regiment in the Philippines from 1899 to 1900. He was with the Punitive Expedition in Mexico in 1916 after graduating from the Mounted Service School. During World War I, Winans commanded the 64th Brigade of the 32d Division, which was then serving in France as part of the American Expeditionary Forces (AEF) from July 1918 onwards. He served with distinction during the war, earning the Army Distinguished Service Medal while in command of the brigade, the citation for which reads:

On August 23, 1920, Winans took command of the 10th Cavalry at Fort Huachuca and distinguished himself as a leader able to vastly improve a unit while commanding respect, loyalty, and results. The following year, former Third Army commander Major General Joseph T. Dickman, VIII Corps Area Commanding General, commended him for the condition of the 10th Cavalry, and for the excellent morale and esprit of the regiment.

On the whole, I consider the Tenth Cavalry to be as good, and in some respects better, than the Thirteenth Cavalry, which up to this time, was in the best condition of any regiment I had ever inspected.

Colonel Winans was quick to relate the commendation to his troops, saying that the "officers and men are entitled to equal share in the credit, for without their cooperation, such a showing would have been impossible."

In 1927 Winans was assigned as Superintendent of the United States Military Academy. Then he was assigned as commander of the Hawaiian Division. Later, he commanded the 8th Corps Area, Fort Sam Houston, Texas, until he was assigned the task of reactivation of the Third Army. Winans assumed command of the Third Army on September 15, 1932, at Fort Sam Houston, Texas. He retired October 31, 1933. After retirement, he served on a League of Nations commission.

Major General Winans' awards include the Army Distinguished Service Medal "for exceptionally distinguished and meritorious service" during three major offensives; Legion of Honour and Croix de Guerre with two palms by the French Government.

Winans made his home in Vienna, Virginia. He died on December 31, 1947, at Walter Reed Hospital, and was buried in the cemetery at the United States Military Academy on January 3, 1948.

References

1869 births
1947 deaths
United States Army Cavalry Branch personnel
People from Livingston County, Michigan
United States Military Academy alumni
Military personnel from Michigan
United States Army generals of World War I
Recipients of the Silver Star
Recipients of the Distinguished Service Medal (US Army)
Recipients of the Legion of Honour
Recipients of the Croix de Guerre 1914–1918 (France)
United States Army generals
Superintendents of the United States Military Academy
People from Vienna, Virginia
Burials at West Point Cemetery